Shut Up and Eat was a sandwich shop in Portland, Oregon.

Description 
Shut Up and Eat was a "Philly-inspired" food cart at the A La Carts pod on Division Street, and later a brick and mortar sandwich shop at the intersection of Cesar Chavez Boulevard and Gladstone Street in southeast Portland's Creston-Kenilworth neighborhood. The casual counter-service restaurant's menu included breakfast, meatball, and submarine sandwiches, cheesesteaks (including one called the Broad Street Bomber), and other sandwiches. The Butternut Squash sandwich had roasted butternut squash, egg, and arugula on an English muffin. The mortadella sandwich had mortadella, provolone, fried egg, and caramelized onions.

History 
Former Philadelphia resident John Fimmano and Glenn Hollenbeck started Shut Up and Eat as a food cart, then transitioned to a brick and mortar operation in 2012. The restaurant closed unexpectedly in March 2019. A note posted on social media and the restaurant's windows said:  The Japanese-Hawaiian restaurant Hapa PDX began operating in the space, starting in August 2019.

Reception 
Bradley Foster and Andy Kryza included Shut Up and Eat in Thrillist's 2013 list of the "coolest bars and restaurants in town". In 2014, Michael Russell of The Oregonian gave the restaurant a one star rating. Russell included the mortadella sandwich in a 2015 overview of the city's best sandwiches, and ranked Shut Up and Eat number 9 in the newspaper's 2017 list of the city's 17 best sandwich shops. Drew Tyson included the Bomber on Thrillist's 2015 list of "Where to Get the 11 Best Cheesesteaks in Portland".

See also 
 List of defunct restaurants of the United States

References

External links 

 Shut Up and Eat at Thrillist
 Shut Up and Eat at Zomato

2019 disestablishments in Oregon
Creston-Kenilworth, Portland, Oregon
Defunct restaurants in Portland, Oregon
Restaurants disestablished in 2019
Sandwich restaurants